Neile Graham (born October 8, 1958) is a poet and scholar. She was born in Winnipeg, Manitoba, and currently lives in Seattle in the United States.

Graham serves as the program administrator for both the PhD in the Built Environment and the interdisciplinary certificates in Urban Design and Historic Preservation in the College of Built Environments (formerly the College of Architecture and Urban Planning) at the University of Washington. She also administers the Clarion West Writers Workshop.

Awards

 2017 World Fantasy Award for Special Award, Non-Professional for excellence in the genre as Workshop Director, Clarion West (winner)

Bibliography
Seven Robins Penumbra Press - 1983
Spells for Clear Vision Brick Books – 1994
Sheela-Na-Gig Reference West – 1995
Blood Memory Buschek Books – 2000
The Walk She Takes MoonPath Press – 2019

References

External links
Biography from her personal website

1958 births
Living people
20th-century Canadian poets
21st-century Canadian poets
Writers from Seattle
Canadian women poets
Women science fiction and fantasy writers
World Fantasy Award-winning writers
20th-century Canadian women writers
21st-century Canadian women writers
21st-century Canadian novelists
Canadian women novelists
Canadian fantasy writers
Writers from Winnipeg
Canadian expatriate writers in the United States